Prunières is the name of several communes in France:

 Prunières, Hautes-Alpes
 Prunières, Isère
 Prunières, Lozère

See also
Henry Prunières (1886–1942), French musicologist